Eurycoleus is a genus of beetles in the family Carabidae, containing the following species:

 Eurycoleus erwini Shpeley & Ball, 2000  
 Eurycoleus fofus Reichardt, 1976 
 Eurycoleus macularius (Chevrolat, 1835) 
 Eurycoleus octosignatus Bates, 1883 
 Eurycoleus ornatus Bates, 1883 
 Eurycoleus poecilopterus (Buquet, 1834) 
 Eurycoleus septemplagiatus Chaudoir, 1877 
 Eurycoleus tredecimpunctatus Chaudoir, 1869

References

Lebiinae